The Canal Street station was a station on the demolished IRT Third Avenue Line in Manhattan, New York City, near the foot of the Manhattan Bridge. It had three tracks and two island platforms. This station closed on May 12, 1955, with the ending of all service on the Third Avenue El south of 149th Street.

References

External links
 

IRT Third Avenue Line stations
Railway stations closed in 1955
Former elevated and subway stations in Manhattan
1955 disestablishments in New York (state)